Terephthaloyl chloride (TCL, 1,4-benzenedicarbonyl chloride) is the acyl chloride of terephthalic acid.  It is a white solid. It is one of two precursors used to make Kevlar(R), the other being p-phenylenediamine. TCL is used as a key component in performance polymers and aramid fibers, where it imparts flame resistance, chemical resistance, temperature stability, light weight, and very high strength. TCL is also an effective water scavenger, used to stabilize isocyanates and urethane prepolymers.

Preparation
Terephthalic acid dichloride is produced commercially by the reaction of 1,4-bis(trichloromethyl)benzene with terephthalic acid:
 C6H4(CCl3)2  +  C6H4(CO2H)2  →  2 C6H4(COCl)2 +  2 HCl

It can also be obtained by chlorination of dimethyl terephthalate.

Use
TCL is used for making various copolymers and aramid polymers such as Heracron, Twaron and Kevlar(R):

References

External links
 
 Aramid

Acyl chlorides
Benzene derivatives
Monomers